Coelospermum reticulatum is a species of flowering plant in the family Rubiaceae. It is native to New Guinea, the Northern Territory, and Queensland. Its natural habitat is dry rainforest and moister Eucalyptus woodland. The plant is an important source of dye for Aboriginal people. The former genus Pogonolobus with its sole species, Pogonolobus reticulatus, has been synonymised with this species.

Image gallery

References

External links
Kew World Checklist of Selected Plant Families, Coelospermum reticulatum

Morindeae
Flora of Queensland
Flora of the Northern Territory
Australian Aboriginal bushcraft
Drought-tolerant plants
Plant dyes
Taxa named by Ferdinand von Mueller